Cheneyville may refer to a place in the United States:

 Cheneyville, Illinois
 Cheneyville, Louisiana

See also 
 Chaneyville, Maryland